Ikkyū-san is a Japanese historical comedy anime series produced by Toei Animation, based on the recorded early life of Zen Buddhist monk Ikkyū during his stay at Ankoku-ji Temple. The anime was directed by Kimio Yabuki and written by Makoto Tsuji, Tadaki Yamazaki, Hisao Okawa, Tatsuo Tamura, Hiroyasu Yamaura and Keisuke Fujikawa. It aired on TV Asahi from October 15, 1975 to June 28, 1982.

The series was received by all ages in Japan and throughout Asia, as it is mostly non-violent. Even when violence appears, it is usually presented in a mild or necessary way (for example, there are occasional references to the Ōnin War). In 1976, there was also a theatrical film released as part of the Toei Manga Matsui film festival in the summer of that year.

Summary 
Ikkyū-san (一休宗純, Ikkyū Sōjun) was born in 1394 in Kyoto. He was the son of Emperor Go-Komatsu and Mrs. Iyo. Ikkyu and his mother had to leave the palace because of the political problem of Japan. When he was 5 years old, he was separated from his mother and was sent to be ordained at Ankoku-ji Temple. Great artistic liberties are taken with regards to the depiction of Ikkyu's cartoon version and his real-life counterpart. In the anime, he is so cute and very neat. In the series, Ikkyū relies on his intelligence and wit to solve all types of problems, from distraught farmers to greedy merchants. A running gag of Ikkyū-san is that whenever Ikkyū is trying to think of a plan, he sits in a lotus position, wets his two index fingers, and rotates them above his head. 

In fact, he is a person who has different ideas from people around him so Mr. Ka-so has appointed his senior as Abbot instead of him. He decided to travel to various locations which gave him an opportunity to meet many famous artists and poets. Ikkyu was appointed as the abbot at the Daitoku-ji temple to restore it after destruction. He returned to the Ankoku-ji Temple, which is the last place where he lives, before he died at the age of 87 years in 1481.

Cast
Toshiko Fujita as Ikkyū-san 
Reiko Katsura as Sayo-chan
Sanji Hase as Shūnen
Kōhei Miyauchi as Gaikan Oshō
Keiichi Noda as Shinemon Ninagawa
Shunji Yamada as Yoshimitsu Ashikaga

Voice Actor 
 Charmaine Sheh as Ikkyu-san (余詩曼)

Reception 

In 2005, Japanese television network TV Asahi conducted an online web poll for the top one hundred anime, and Ikkyū-san placed 85th tied with Hana no Ko Lunlun.

This animation has become one of the most famous Japanese anime in China. So, this anime was chosen to promote international tourism.

Trivia
This series is referenced in 2008 by Tokine Yukimura in a flashback on episode 50 of Kekkaishi.

Wednesday Campanella have a song and PV named after Ikkyu-san.

References

External links

 
 

1975 anime television series debuts
Asia Television
Toei Animation television
Toei Animation films
TV Asahi original programming
Fictional Buddhist monks
Television series about Buddhism
Films about Buddhism
Buddhist animation
Ikkyū